Pentanopsis is a genus of flowering plants belonging to the family Rubiaceae.

Its native range is Ethiopia to Northern Kenya.

Species
Species:

Pentanopsis fragrans 
Pentanopsis gracilicaulis

References

Rubiaceae
Rubiaceae genera